Séamus Qualter (born 1967) is an Irish former hurler and hurling manager.

Born in Turloughmore, County Galway, Qualter played competitive hurling in his youth. At club level he is a one-time Connacht medallist with Turlougmore. In addition to this he also won one championship medal with the club. He managed Westmeath to the inaugural ChristyRing Cup triumph in 2005. That same year he was coach and manager of the Irish Shinty team when they played Scotland in Inverness. In 2006 Westmeath defeated Dublin in the Leinster Senior hurling quarter final, and he managed the team against Brian Cody's Kilkenny in the semi final in Mullingar. Westmeath lost the game 1-23 to 1-7 attended by 8,500, a record for a Westmeath hurling game. He repeated his Christy Ring success in 2007 when Westmeath defeated Kildare in the final. In 2011 he managed Roscommon to win division 2b of the national hurling league and in 2012 managed the same county to win the all Ireland b hurling title when they defeated Kildare in the final 3-17 to 3-16 in Thurles.

Manager 

After retirement from playing Qualter became involved in team management and coaching. At club level he has managed St. Faithleach's Gaelic football team in Roscommon. During his tenure as manager of the Westmeath senior hurling team, Qualter delivered two Christy Ring Cup titles, while he also took charge of the Westmeath minor hurlers. He later served as manager of the Roscommon under-21 and senior hurling teams.

Family 

His father, P. J. Qualter, played hurling for Galway from 1966 until 1977, while his son, Danny, is a rugby union player for Nottingham Rugby.

Honours

Player

Turloughmore
Connacht Senior Club Hurling Championship (1): 1985
Galway Senior Club Hurling Championship (1): 1985
Galway Minor Club Hurling Championship (1): 1984

Manager

 Westmeath—Christy Ring Cup (2): 2005, 2007

References

 

1966 births
20th-century Irish people
21st-century Irish people
Living people
Turloughmore hurlers
Hurling managers
Sportspeople from County Galway